The 2001 UK & Ireland Greyhound Racing Year was the 75th year of greyhound racing in the United Kingdom and Ireland.

Roll of honour

Summary
The National Greyhound Racing Club (NGRC) released the annual returns, with totalisator turnover at £91,969,298 and attendances recorded at 3,887,265 from 6180 meetings.

Rapid Ranger trained by Charlie Lister was voted Greyhound of the Year after winning his second English Greyhound Derby. The brindle dog joined an elite band of three greyhounds to win the Derby twice. Only Mick the Miller and Patricias Hope had previously achieved the feat.

Linda Jones won the Greyhound Trainer of the Year but it was fellow trainer John McGee Sr. that once again hit the headlines, with a controversy regarding the trainer's championship to be held at Hove. McGee qualified for the top six Trainers' Championship by virtue of finishing fifth in the 2000 standings but was upset at the fact that John Mullins was allowed to take the place of his mother Linda Mullins. John Mullins had taken control of the kennels following Linda's retirement but an angry John McGee stated "I read that it was an unanimous decision" referring to the announcement made by the Professional Greyhound Trainers' Association (PGTA), "but unanimous by who? "They should have asked the five other trainers who have qualified what they thought, not just changed the rules because they wanted John Mullins in." The anger was brought on by the fact that he had been denied an invitation to run in the 1988 championship after taking over the kennel from Fred Wiseman, who led the 1987 standings. "I was head man to Fred Wiseman, but everyone knew I was doing the dogs and we won everything that year". The Championship went ahead and was won by Charlie Lister but the controversy surrounding McGee continued, when later in the year he had a positive urine sample taken from Apple Rambler at Wimbledon. The NGRC once again withdrew his licence and he was told that no further application would be considered until January 2003.

Tracks
Advanced plans by the Greyhound Racing Association to open a 2,000 seater stadium at Fazakerley in the north of Liverpool failed to materialise following opposition from residents. Liverpool had lost greyhound racing in 1973 despite having four prominent profitable tracks at one stage.

Castleford Whitwood Stadium held its final meeting in February; it had existed in spells as a licensed and independent track since 1938.

News
Trainer Graham Holland left Oxford to join Hove and was replaced by Nick Colton. Carly Philpott took out her first licence following in the footsteps of her father Paul Philpott and Maxine Locke joined Catford. Leading owner Len Ponder moved all of his greyhounds from trainer Ray Peacock and transferred them to Seamus Cahill.

Owen McKenna son of Ger McKenna decided to return to Ireland to train mainly for David Miles (responsible for the Reactabond prefix) in Ballyclerihan. Despite having a contract at Wimbledon, McKenna had expressed concerns over lack of races and poor prize money.

Competitions
The Nick Savva trained Sonic Flight won a strong Scottish Greyhound Derby, a competition that saw the shock disqualification in the first round of prolific open race winner El Boss, who was subsequently retired. Sonic Flight also won the Select Stakes and Irish Laurels.

The veteran Palace Issue now trained by John Mullins retired after failing to win the Golden Jacket but winning 69 of his 111 races and picking up £65,000 in prize money.

No Can Waltz enjoyed a good year, the Linda Jones trained white and brindle had finished second in the Arc final and third in the Scottish Derby and won the Test before a good Grand Prix campaign at Walthamstow Stadium came to an end losing to Slick Tom. He finished the year by reaching the St Leger final, he was arguably the best stayer ahead of Solid Magic who claimed the first Cesarewitch to be held at Oxford and the Olympic title.

Ireland
2001 was a vintage year for stars, in the United Kingdom Rapid Ranger had dominated the news and Sonic Flight had a great year. In Ireland Cool Performance won the Derby but he was overshadowed by two of the finalists, Late Late Show and Droopys Kewell. Late Late Show owned by Pat Kenny and duly named after the popular show The Late Late Show became the nation's favourite greyhound. The black dog won the Easter Cup and Shelbourne 600, in addition to finishing runner-up in the Derby and being a finalist in the Champion Stakes. Droopys Kewell won three major events; the National Produce, St Leger and Champion Stakes. In any other year Droopys Kewell would have been Irish Greyhound of the Year but the accolade went to Late Late Show.

Principal UK races

Principal Irish finals

Totalisator returns

The totalisator returns declared to the National Greyhound Racing Club for the year 2001 are listed below.

References 

Greyhound racing in the United Kingdom
Greyhound racing in the Republic of Ireland
UK and Ireland Greyhound Racing Year
UK and Ireland Greyhound Racing Year
UK and Ireland Greyhound Racing Year
UK and Ireland Greyhound Racing Year